NCAA Division I champions are the winners of annual top-tier competitions among American college sports teams. This list also includes championships classified by the NCAA as "National Collegiate",  the organization's official branding of championship events open to members of more than one of the NCAA's three legislative and competitive divisions.

In college football, the only championship actually awarded by the NCAA is that of the second level of D-I football, the Football Championship Subdivision. While champions of the top level, the Football Bowl Subdivision, are included in NCAA record books, the NCAA has never awarded an official championship at that level. FBS championships are awarded by non-NCAA bodies, with the current de facto championship, the College Football Playoff, operated by a consortium of FBS conferences.

Men's champions

Women's champions

Coeducational champions

Footnotes

References